Hathor 14 - Coptic Calendar - Hathor 16

The fifteenth day of the Coptic month of Hathor, the third month of the Coptic year. On a common year, this day corresponds to November 11, of the Julian Calendar, and November 24, of the Gregorian Calendar. This day falls in the Coptic season of Peret, the season of emergence.

Commemorations

Saints 

 The martyrdom of Saint Mina the Wonderworker 
 The departure of Saint John the Priest-Monk

References 

Days of the Coptic calendar